U.S. Route 160 (US 160) is a part of the U.S. Highway System that travels from Tuba City, Arizona, to Poplar Bluff, Missouri. In the State of Colorado, US 160 starts at the New Mexico state line southwest of Cortez and ends at the Kansas state line east of Springfield.

Route description

US 160 enters Colorado near the Four Corners Monument. It goes northeast and intersects US 491, then turns north to enter Cortez with US 491. East of Cortez, a road leads south from US 160 to Mesa Verde National Park. It continues east to Durango, where it intersects US 550. After overlapping with US 550 south of Durango, US 160 turns east and meets US 84 at Pagosa Springs. It then goes northeast and crosses the Continental Divide at Wolf Creek Pass, the area made popular in 1975 in C.W. McCall's album Wolf Creek Pass.

From Wolf Creek Pass, US 160 continues northeast and turns east at South Fork. At Monte Vista, an overlap begins with US 285, which continues southeast into Alamosa. It turns east, then goes northeast to go through North La Veta Pass, then continues east to Walsenburg, where it intersects Interstate 25 (I-25).

From Walsenburg, US 160 continues south with I-25 to Trinidad, then turns northeast to intersect US 350. It continues east, passing through the Comanche National Grassland before intersecting the concurrent US 287 and US 385 south of Springfield. It continues east and enters Kansas east of Walsh.

History

As commissioned in 1930 the western terminus was Trinidad. In 1939, US 160 absorbed all of former route U.S. Highway 450 which ran from US 50 at Crescent Junction, Utah to US 85 at Walsenburg.

In 1970, many US Highways in the Four Corners region were realigned. US 160 was diverted southwesterly from Cortez to follow its present route past the Four Corners into Arizona, absorbing the route numbered U.S. Highway 164. 

In 2021, the portion of the highway between Walsenburg and the highway's junction with Colorado State Highway 12 was designated a National Scenic Byway. The designation, which includes State Highway 12 and the county roads over Cordova Pass, is called the Scenic Highway of Legends.

Junction list

See also

 List of U.S. Highways in Colorado

References

External links

60-1
Transportation in Montezuma County, Colorado
Transportation in La Plata County, Colorado
Transportation in Archuleta County, Colorado
Transportation in Mineral County, Colorado
Transportation in Rio Grande County, Colorado
Transportation in Alamosa County, Colorado
Transportation in Costilla County, Colorado
Transportation in Huerfano County, Colorado
Transportation in Las Animas County, Colorado
Transportation in Baca County, Colorado
 Colorado